Adam Rolland Rainy (3 April 1862 – 26 August 1911) was a Liberal Party politician in Scotland who sat in the House of Commons for Kilmarnock Burghs. By profession he was a surgeon oculist.

Life

He was the son of the Very Rev Robert Rainy DD (1826–1906), Principal of New College, Edinburgh and his wife, Susan Rolland (1835–1905), the granddaughter of Adam Rolland, and was born and raised in Edinburgh.

He is buried in the Rainy family plot in Dean Cemetery in western Edinburgh against the southern retaining wall.

His wife was a leader in the Scottish Women's Liberal Federation and suffragist.

His son, also Adam Rolland Rainy (1889–1926), won the Military Cross in the Royal Artillery in the First World War, but died in Natal.

Political career
In 1900 Rainy embarked on a political career when he stood for parliament at the 1900 General Election. He had been selected as Liberal Party candidate for the marginal Conservative seat of Kilmarnock Burghs. Against the background of the Second Boer War, the Liberal Party made few gains and Rainy was unable to win the seat;
He was re-selected as Liberal candidate and at the 1906 general election he had an easier task on two accounts, the incumbent Conservative Member of Parliament was not re-standing and the elections were held at a better moment for the Liberals who had just assumed office. He gained the seat with ease; 
In parliament he sat on the government backbenches, without accepting government office. In 1907 was the Seconder of the Address in the Commons. He was an active supporter of Scottish Home Rule. In 1908 he seconded the motion of Irish leader John Redmond in favour of Home Rule for both Ireland and Scotland. He sought re-election for Kilmarnock at the next general election in January 1910. The popularity of the Liberals fell from its height of 1906, but despite this, Rainy actually managed to increase his majority;
Within 11 months another general election took place, producing an almost identical result both nationally and in Kilmarnock.
He died on 26 August 1911 at the youthful age of 49, causing the 1911 Kilmarnock Burghs by-election. In 1915 his widow Annabelle had published by J. Maclehose the Life of Adam Rolland Rainy, MP.

Election results

References

External links 

1862 births
1911 deaths
Scottish Liberal Party MPs
Members of the Parliament of the United Kingdom for Scottish constituencies
UK MPs 1906–1910
UK MPs 1910
UK MPs 1910–1918
Scottish ophthalmologists